The 2019 Formula 4 South East Asia Championship – Fueled by Petron was the fourth season of the Formula 4 South East Asia Championship. It began at the Sepang International Circuit on 5 April and ended at the same venue on 15 December.

Drivers
The following drivers competed in the series. All cars were run by Malaysian team Meritus GP. All drivers used the Mygale M14-F4 chassis.

Calendar
The ten-event, forty-race calendar was released on 2 April 2019. On 9 October 2019 the series announced it was replacing the final 2 rounds at Clark International Speedway with 2 rounds at Sepang International Circuit.

Championship standings
The best 32 results out of 40 races counted towards the championship. Points were awarded as follows.

(key)

Drivers' standings

Footnotes

References

External links 

 

South East Asia
Formula 4 South East Asia Championship
Formula 4 South East Asia Championship
South East Asia F4
2019 in Malaysian motorsport